The New Nambu M65/M66 (originally called the SCK-65/66) is a Japanese submachine gun manufactured in 1965 by Shin-Chuō Koygo Industries (Formerly Nambu Arms Manufacturing Company; now Minebea). It is blowback operated, and fires from an open bolt. It fires the 9×19mm Parabellum round, from 30 round box magazines. The firearm was only tested and produced under trials for the considered replacement of the aging M3 submachine gun that was supplied by the United States Military during the formation of the National Police Reserve after the war.

See also
Carl Gustav m/45
Smith & Wesson M76
TEC-9

References

9mm Parabellum submachine guns
Cold War weapons of Japan
Submachine guns of Japan
Japan Self-Defense Forces